In Hindustani music, a pakad (Hindi:  पकड़) is a generally accepted musical phrase (or set of phrases) thought to encapsulate the essence of a particular raga. The pakad contains the melodic theme of the raga, on listening to the pakad a person who knows the raga is usually able to identify it. In many cases, the ragas contain the same swaras (notes), then the pakad also contains information about gayaki or chalan (the way the notes are to be ordered and played/sung). Usually, the pakad is formed from short convolutions of the arohana and avarohana, while in some cases it is quite different from them. The pakad for a particular raga need not be unique, its sole purpose is to clarify what raga it is.

For example, here is a pakad for raga Yaman, a prominent raga from Hindustani music:

Ni* Re Ga Ma# Pa, Ma# Ga Re Sa.
An important aspect of a Pakad is Laya. Lay essentially means time, but contextually, it means how time is spent. Lay helps us to place emphasis on specific notes by giving them longer playing time - this helps to properly space apart notes. Without spacing apart notes accordingly, a Raag will fail to show it’s true characteristics, and this is why a Pakad is important to truly understand a raag.
Hindustani music theory
Carnatic music
Hindustani music terminology